Ahwai, also called the Ndunic languages (formerly Nandu-Tari), is a Plateau language cluster spoken to the southwest of Fadan Karshi in Sanga LGA, Kaduna State, Nigeria. Most villages are located at the foot of the Ahwai Mountains in Kaduna State.

Dialects
There are three mutually intelligible dialects:
Ndun (Nandu), spoken just to the southwest of the Ahwai Mountains.
Nyeng (Ningon), spoken just to the northwest of the Ahwai Mountains. First documented in 2003.
Shakara (Tari), spoken just to the southeast of the Ahwai Mountains.

Blench (2008) classified them as distinct Ndunic languages. However, that same year Ethnologue merged them as a single language.

Ahwai is a self-designated term used to refer to speakers of all three Ndunic languages.

Ndun
Ndun is also known by the Hausa name Nandu. Ndun villages are Ànkpòŋ, Anfufalǐm, Ŋ̀bòk, Ànkàrà, Bányìn, and Ungwar Rimi.

In Nince village, Kaduna State, the Nisam (Nince) people have all shifted to Ndun. The Nisam language remains undocumented.

Nyeng
Nyeng is spoken by about 2,000 speakers in Adu and other villages in Kaduna State, Nigeria. The Nyeng people used to live on the hill of ifyal anyeŋ. Today, their villages are:

A word list of Nyeng was collected by Roger Blench and Barau Kato in 2003.

Shakara
The main settlements of the Shakara are Jije Fyal, Nggwakum, Akayi, Apɔhɔt, Telehwe, Kobo, Koba, Nggwa Dauda, Nggwa Mangoro, Nggwa Igyan, Barib, and formerly Nggwa Yiri (now uninhabited).

Names and locations
Below is a list of Ndunic language names, populations, and locations from Blench (2019).

References

Blench, Roger (2008). Prospecting proto-Plateau. Manuscript.
Ethnologue merger of Ndunic

External links
Roger Blench: Ndunic materials

Plateau languages
Languages of Nigeria